The 13th West Virginia Infantry Regiment was an infantry regiment that served in the Union Army during the American Civil War.

Service
The 13th West Virginia  Infantry Regiment was organized at Point Pleasant and Barboursville in western Virginia in October, 1862, and mustered out on June 22, 1865.

Casualties
The 13th West Virginia Infantry Regiment suffered four Officers and 57 enlisted men killed in battle or died from wounds, and one officer and 108 enlisted men dead from disease for a total of 170 fatalities.

See also
West Virginia Units in the Civil War
West Virginia in the Civil War

References

The Civil War Archive

Units and formations of the Union Army from West Virginia
1862 establishments in Virginia
Military units and formations established in 1862
Military units and formations disestablished in 1865